3-Ethyl-3-pentanol, also known as 3-ethylpentan-3-ol, is a tertiary alcohol with the molecular formula C7H16O.

References

Alkanols
Tertiary alcohols